Terence Victor Smith (born 10 July 1942) is an English former professional footballer who played in the Football League for Mansfield Town.

References

1942 births
Living people
English footballers
Association football midfielders
English Football League players
Mansfield Town F.C. players